The 2017 Sheikh Kamal International Club Cup, also known as Sheikh Kamal Gold Cup 2017, was the 2nd edition of Sheikh Kamal International Club Cup, an international club football tournament hosted by the Chittagong Abahani in association with the Bangladesh Football Federation. The tournament took place at the M. A. Aziz Stadium from 18 February 2017 in the port city of Chittagong. TC Sports Club of Maldives became champion after beating Pocheon Citizen on penalty shoot-out.

Participating teams
Eight clubs sent their team to participate in the tournament from 5 nations of AFC Three teams from Bangladesh, one of each from South Korea, Afghanistan, Maldives, Kyrgyzstan as well as Nepal participated.

Following are the participated teams:
 Chittagong Abahani (Host)
 Dhaka Mohammedan
 Dhaka Abahani
 FC Pocheon
 TC Sports Club
 Shaheen Asmayee F.C. 
 FC Alga Bishkek
 Manang Marshyangdi Club

Prize money
Prize money for 2017 Sheikh Kamal International Club Cup.

Venue

Draw
The draw ceremony were held 16 February 2017 at BFF house Motijheel Dhaka. The eight participants were divided into two groups. The top two teams from each group advanced to the semi-finals.

Group stage
 All matches were played at Chittagong
 Times Listed are UTC+6:00

Group A

Group B

Bracket

Semi-finals

Final

Winners

Goalscorers

References

Sheikh Kamal International Club Cup
2017 in Bangladeshi football